Dutsi may refer to:

Dutsi, Nigeria, a Local Government Area in Katsina State
The Tibetan Buddhist name for Amrita